8 Gurney is a 38-storey condominium within the city of George Town in Penang, Malaysia. Completed in 2013, it was built by Pulau Ceria, a subsidiary of CA+ Associates.

See also 
List of tallest buildings in George Town
 Gurney Drive

References 

Buildings and structures in George Town, Penang
Residential skyscrapers in Malaysia
2013 establishments in Malaysia
Residential buildings completed in 2013